Donald W. Molloy (born July 18, 1946) is a senior United States district judge of the United States District Court for the District of Montana.

Early life and education
Born into an Irish-American family in Butte, Montana, Molloy received a Bachelor of Arts degree from the University of Montana in 1968 and a Juris Doctor from the University of Montana School of Law in 1976, where he was a member of the Law Review. He was in the United States Navy, Naval Aviation from 1968 to 1973, where he became a lieutenant and served on the aircraft carrier USS John F. Kennedy (CVA-67). He was a law clerk to Judge James F. Battin of the United States District Court for the District of Montana from 1976 to 1978. He was in private practice in Billings, Montana from 1978 to 1995, where he was recognized as "one of the ablest lawyers in the state", holding various leadership roles in organizations in the legal community.

Federal judicial service

When long-serving district judge Paul G. Hatfield announced his intent to take senior status in 1995, numerous Montana attorneys put themselves forward as potential successors on the United States District Court for the District of Montana, including Molloy. Senator Max Baucus recommended Molloy to President Bill Clinton, who nominated Molloy to the seat on December 21, 1995. Molloy was confirmed by the United States Senate on July 18, 1996, and received his commission on August 1, 1996. He served as chief judge from 2001 to 2008, and declared his intent to retire in December 2010, finally assuming senior status on August 16, 2011. Among his more noted rulings was a decision to return wolves in Montana and Idaho to the endangered species list, over the objection of the United States Fish and Wildlife Service.

References

Sources

1946 births
Living people
Judges of the United States District Court for the District of Montana
United States district court judges appointed by Bill Clinton
University of Montana alumni
United States Navy officers
American people of Irish descent
People from Butte, Montana
20th-century American judges
21st-century American judges